"Preachin' the Blues" by Bessie Smith
 "Atlanta, G.A.", pop/big band song written by Sunny Skylar and Artie Shaftel 1945
 "Atlanta Blues (Make Me One Pallet On Your Floor)" by Eartha Kitt from "St. Louis Blues" 1958
 "Hot 'Lanta" (instrumental) by The Allman Brothers Band, from At Fillmore East 1971
 "Doraville" by Southern rock band Atlanta Rhythm Section, from Third Annual Pipe Dream 1974
 "Oh Atlanta" by L.A. band Little Feat, from Feats Don't Fail Me Now 1974
 "Rock'n Me" by Steve Miller Band ("Philadelphia, Atlanta, L.A.") 1976
 "Atlanta June" by Pablo Cruise from A Place in the Sun 1977
 "I'm the Only Hell (Mama Ever Raised)" by Johnny Paycheck, from Slide Off of Your Satin Sheets 1977
 "Atlanta's Burning Down" by Dickey Betts (of The Allman Brothers) from Atlanta's Burning Down, Southern rock 1978
 "Oh, Atlanta" by British hard rock band Bad Company, from Desolation Angels 1979; also covered by Alison Krauss
 "Atlanta Lady (Something About Your Love)" by Marty Balin (of Jefferson Airplane), 1981
 "Atlanta Burned Again Last Night" by country group Atlanta, from Pictures 1983
 "Badstreet U.S.A" by Michael Hayes (wrestler) 1987
 "Girls, Girls, Girls" by Mötley Crüe, ("rockin' in Atlanta at Tattletales") 1987
 "200 More Miles" by Canadian band Cowboy Junkies, from The Trinity Session 1988
 "Love Shack" by Athens band The B-52's, from Cosmic Thing ("headin' down the Atlanta highway"), a reference to nearby Athens, dance-rock, (#3 on Billboard Hot 100 in 1989)
 "Going to Georgia" by The Mountain Goats from Zopilote Machine, 1994
 "Southernplayalisticadillacmuzik" by Outkast, Southern hip hop 1994
 “ATLiens” by OutKast from “ATLiens” 1996
 "Atlanta" by Stone Temple Pilots, from No. 4 1999
 "Neon" by John Mayer, bluesy song mentions Peachtree Street, from Room for Squares 2001, and Inside Wants Out
 "ATL Eternally" (featuring Pastor Troy and Lil Jon & the Eastside Boyz) from Alley: The Return of the Ying Yang Twins 2002
 "ATL Hoe" by Baby D, Pastor Troy, Archie and Lil Jon 2002
 "Welcome to Atlanta" by Jermaine Dupri and Ludacris, from Word of Mouf and Instructions (#3 on Billboard Hot Rap Singles) 2002
 "F.I.L.A (Forever I Love Atlanta)" by Lil Scrappy feat. Lil Jon crunk, 2004
 "Oh" by Ciara feat. Ludacris ("Adamsville, Bankhead, College Park"), (#2 on Billboard Hot 100), 2005
 "Georgia" by Field Mob and Ludacris ft. Jamie Foxx (as Ray Charles), from Disturbing tha Peace 2005
 "ATL" by Freak Nasty, (rap, Miami bass), 2006
 "Bad Education" by Tilly and the Wall 2006
 "ATL" alt. rock song by Butch Walker, from Sycamore Meadows 2008
 "One More Drink" by Ludacris ft. T-Pain, from Theater of the Mind hip hop and R&B, (#4 Hot Rap Songs), 2008
 "Atlanta, GA" by Shawty Lo (of D4L, d.2016) featuring The-Dream, Ludacris and Gucci Mane), 2010
 "Communicating Doors" by The Extra Lens (From Undercard), 2010
 "Atlanta" by Ron Pope (from Atlanta), 2012
 "New Atlanta" by Migos ft. Jermaine Dupri, Young Thug and Rich Homie Quan from No Label 2, trap music, 2014
 "East Atlanta Day" by Zaytoven featuring Gucci Mane and 21 Savage
 "Panda" by Desiigner (not from ATL), from New English (mixtape), ("I got broads in Atlanta"), 2016
 "Havana" by Camila Cabello ft. Young Thug ("he took me back to East Atlanta") (#1 on Billboard Hot 100), 2017-2018
 "East Atlanta Love Letter" by 6lack ft. Future (rapper), from East Atlanta Love Letter 2018
 “Butterfly Effect” by Travis Scott album Astroworld (“Fly the broads, fly the dogs down to Atlanta, yeah”), 2018
 "1000 Nights" by Ed Sheeran feat. Meek Mill & A Boogie Wit Da Hoodie (they aren't from ATL), from No. 6 Collaborations Project, ("Last night I played a show in Atlanta; Husbands and wives, daddies and daughters with their cameras"), 2019
 "Moon over Georgia" by Shenandoah (band)

References

Songs
Culture of Atlanta
Atlanta
Songs about Georgia (U.S. state)
 Atlanta